Cossinia is a genus of four species of rainforest trees, constituting part of the plant family Sapindaceae. The genus has a disjunct distribution, occurring in Mascarene Islands, Australia, New Caledonia and Fiji.

They grow naturally in rainforests, including seasonally drought–prone rainforests, and associated non–fire–adapted vegetation types.

Cossinia trifoliata trees, endemic to New Caledonia, have become vulnerable to global extinction according to the International Union for Conservation of Nature (IUCN)'s 1998 assessment.

Cossinia australiana trees, endemic to restricted habitat areas of central-eastern and southeastern Queensland, Australia, have the official national and Queensland state governments' "endangered" conservation status. Within their known endemic region the trees grow naturally in habitats which have historically had their native vegetation extensively destroyed and  have been further threatened.

Naming and classification

The genus was first described in 1786 by Jean-Baptiste Lamarck in Encyclopédie Méthodique: Botanique. The publication includes descriptions of the species Cossinia pinnata and C. triphylla, named earlier by Philibert Commerson.

In 1982 Australian botanist Sally T. Reynolds formally described the new species name Cossinia australiana, recognised that C. triphylla is a synonym of C. pinnata and updated Ludwig A. T. Radlkofer's species identification key to include all four currently accepted species.

Species
 Cossinia australiana  – central–eastern to southeastern Queensland endemic, Australia
 Cossinia pacifica  – Fiji endemic
 Cossinia pinnata , syn.: C. triphylla  – Réunion and Mauritius –Mascarene Islands endemic (Indian Ocean)
 Cossinia trifoliata , syn.: Melicopsidium trifoliatum  – New Caledonia endemic –  Vulnerable

References

External links

Flora of Mauritius
Flora of Madagascar
Flora of Queensland
Flora of New Caledonia
Flora of Fiji
Sapindaceae genera
Sapindales of Australia
Dodonaeoideae
Taxa named by Philibert Commerson
Taxa named by Jean-Baptiste Lamarck